Romário Baldé (born 25 December 1996) is a Bissau-Guinean professional footballer who plays for Chinese Super League club Nantong Zhiyun as a winger. He was born in Guinea-Bissau, but represented Portugal internationally on junior levels. On senior level, he switched allegiance back to his country of birth.

Club career
Born in Bissau, Baldé arrived in the youth ranks of Benfica at age 12, from local Estrela da Amadora.

He represented the club on the debut season of UEFA Youth League, helping them progress all the way through the final, lost to Barcelona. The following season, the 17–year old made his professional debut for Benfica B in a 2014–15 Segunda Liga match against C.D. Trofense on 9 August 2014. He also represented Benfica again in the UEFA Youth League, reaching the quarter-finals against FC Shakhtar Donetsk, where he missed a penalty, attempted in panenka style, that would have given his team the lead. They were later eliminated in the penalty shootout.

In May 2015, Baldé announced that he would be leaving the club, after he could not agree on a new contract with Benfica. However, two months later, he back-tracked on that decision and signed a five-year extension with Benfica, being immediately loaned to Primeira Liga side Tondela for one season. He made his debut for Tondela in the 1–0 loss against Vitória de Guimarães on 13 September, and scored his first goal three weeks later in a 1–1 draw with Moreirense. Being regularly used throughout the season, he finished the campaign with 25 appearances and two goals.

In the following season, Baldé was not loaned out and remained at Benfica B, appearing in 21 games and scoring once. On 25 August 2017, Baldé moved on a permanent deal to Polish club, Lechia Gdańsk, signing a three-year contract. On 31 August, he moved to Académica de Coimbra on a one-year loan with an option to sign permanently.

In March 2023, Baldé joined Chinese Super League club Nantong Zhiyun.

International career
Baldé represented Portugal at the 2014 UEFA European Under-19 Championship, scoring one goal. He captained the Portugal U20s for the 2016 Toulon Tournament.

Baldé made his Guinea-Bissau national team debut on 8 June 2019 in a friendly against Angola, as a half-time substitute for Jorginho.

Honours
Benfica
UEFA Youth League runner-up: 2013–14

References

External links
 
 
 
 
 

1996 births
Living people
Portuguese footballers
Portugal youth international footballers
Bissau-Guinean footballers
Guinea-Bissau international footballers
Sportspeople from Bissau
Bissau-Guinean emigrants to Portugal
Portuguese sportspeople of Bissau-Guinean descent
Association football forwards
S.L. Benfica B players
Associação Académica de Coimbra – O.A.F. players
Liga Portugal 2 players
C.D. Tondela players
Gil Vicente F.C. players
Leixões S.C. players
Primeira Liga players
Lechia Gdańsk players
Ekstraklasa players
Doxa Katokopias FC players
AEL Limassol players
Cypriot First Division players
Romario Balde
Romario Balde
Nantong Zhiyun F.C. players
Chinese Super League players
Portuguese expatriate footballers
Portuguese expatriate sportspeople in Poland
Expatriate footballers in Poland
Bissau-Guinean expatriate sportspeople in Cyprus
Expatriate footballers in Cyprus
Bissau-Guinean expatriate sportspeople in Thailand
Expatriate footballers in Thailand
Bissau-Guinean expatriate sportspeople in China
Expatriate footballers in China
2019 Africa Cup of Nations players